Scotia is a town in Hampton County, South Carolina, United States. The population was 215 at the 2010 census.

Geography
Scotia is located in southwestern Hampton County at  (32.681501, -81.247119). U.S. Route 321 (Columbia Highway) passes through the center of town, leading north  to Estill and south the same distance to Garnett. South Carolina Highway 333 runs east from Scotia  to Furman.

Demographics

As of the census of 2000, there were 227 people, 86 households, and 63 families residing in the town. The population density was 71.3 people per square mile (27.6/km2). There were 99 housing units at an average density of 31.1 per square mile (12.0/km2). The racial makeup of the town was 26.43% White and 73.57% African American. Hispanic or Latino of any race were 2.20% of the population.

There were 86 households, out of which 34.9% had children under the age of 18 living with them, 48.8% were married couples living together, 16.3% had a female householder with no husband present, and 26.7% were non-families. 25.6% of all households were made up of individuals, and 11.6% had someone living alone who was 65 years of age or older. The average household size was 2.64 and the average family size was 3.14.

In the town, the population was spread out, with 29.5% under the age of 18, 6.6% from 18 to 24, 24.7% from 25 to 44, 24.7% from 45 to 64, and 14.5% who were 65 years of age or older. The median age was 39 years. For every 100 females, there were 99.1 males. For every 100 females age 18 and over, there were 86.0 males.

The median income for a household in the town was $22,292, and the median income for a family was $33,250. Males had a median income of $22,250 versus $22,917 for females. The per capita income for the town was $13,202. About 23.1% of families and 25.1% of the population were below the poverty line, including 27.0% of those under the age of eighteen and 21.7% of those 65 or over.

External links
Information about Scotia from Hampton County

References

Towns in Hampton County, South Carolina
Towns in South Carolina